Spilosoma atrivenata is a moth in the  family Erebidae. It was described by Rothschild in 1933. It is found in Tanzania.

References

Endemic fauna of Tanzania
Moths described in 1933
atrivenata